K-223 is a  state highway in the U.S. state of Kansas. K-223's southern terminus is at K-23 south of the community of Leoville, and the northern terminus is at K-383 north of the community of Leoville.

Route description
K-223 is not included in the National Highway System. The National Highway System is a system of highways important to the nation's defense, economy, and mobility. K-223 does connect to the National Highway System at its junction with K-383. 2017 Annual average daily traffic (AADT) on K-223 was 45 vehicles per day.

History
K-223 was planned by the Kansas Department of Transportation (KDOT) in a July 30, 1958 meeting to become a state highway through Leoville as soon as the roadway was brought up to state highway standards. Then by June 1959, the required projects were complete, and the highway became K-223 in a June 10, 1959 resolution. The alignment of K-223 has not changed since its creation.

Major intersections

References

External links

Kansas Department of Transportation State Map
KDOT: Historic State Maps

223
Transportation in Sheridan County, Kansas
Transportation in Decatur County, Kansas